Ziller may refer to:

 Ziller, right-side tributary to the Inn River, in the Zillertal in Tyrol, Austria
 Bruck am Ziller, municipality in the Schwaz district of Tyrol, Austria
 Zell am Ziller, municipality in the Schwaz district of Tyrol, Austria
 Ziller (surname)